Günther Jung (born 2 September 1937 in Tübingen) is a German chemist. He was professor for Organic Chemistry and Biochemistry at the University of Tübingen from 1973 to 2002.

Career 
Günther Jung studied chemistry at the University of Tübingen and after his diploma thesis in 1965 he received his PhD in 1967. From 1967 to 1968 he was assistant professor at the University of Houston in Texas (USA).  In 1971 he was granted permission to teach organic chemistry and biochemistry at the University of Tübingen, where he held a permanent university professorship from 1973 to 2002. His successor in the department of organic chemistry is Stephanie Grond.
 
G. Jung has been in the advisory committee of eight scientific journals and on the boards of several institutions. He was also research consultant in the pharmaceutical industry and organized many international symposia and workshops. Until 1996 he was also director of the biochemistry department at the Research Institute of Natural and Medicinal Sciences and of the Steinbeis-Transfer-Center Bioorganic Chemistry at the University of Tübingen.

G. Jung was a cofounder of the European Peptide Society (EPS) and the European Society of Combinatorial Sciences (ESCS). Together with post-docs of his group he founded two biotech companies in Tübingen. EMC microcollections GmbH with Karl-Heinz Wiesmüller as the director with focus on the development of research tools, and peptides for the lead structure search and lipopeptide vaccines. Lipopeptide vaccines have been presented for the first time in 1985 followed by various in vivo applications which include a protective peptide vaccines against foot-and-mouth disease and the first demonstration of a virus-specific killer cell (CTL) response by a lipopeptide (1989).The lipopeptide adjuvans Pam3Cys-XSI5 developed by Wiesmüller induced in clinical tests of multipeptide vaccines against glioblastoma and CORONA virus strong and long lasting T-cell responses.

Jung's former PhD students Ingmar Hoerr and Florian von der Mülbe founded the biopharmaceutical company CureVac AG. In his pioneering PhD thesis Ingmar Hoerr was the first to develop an RNA vaccine for the induction of specific cytotoxic T-lymphocytes (CTL) and antibodies. This work is the scientific background of CureVac's  messenger RNA as vaccines in oncology and against viral infections.

Research 
More than 120 scientists performed their experimental PhD thesis in the laboratories of G. Jung.

His research was focused on the following areas: structure elucidation and synthesis of natural products, synthetic potential-dependent ion channels in lipid membranes, 3D-structure and biosynthesis of microbial metabolites, automated multiple parallel synthesis of peptides and organic compounds, structure-activity relationships of peptide hormones, biosensor developments, combinatorial chemistry for lead structure search, peptide libraries, complete B- and T-cell epitope mapping of viral proteins, immunobiochemistry.

The sequence motifs of MHC-bound natural peptide libraries (major histocompatibility complex) has been determined for  the first time by Günther Jung's PhD student Stefan Stevanovic in cooperation with the cell-biological group of Hans-Georg Rammensee. The elaborated analytical protocols are essential for the elucidation of the molecular interactions in cellular immunity and for the development of peptide-based personalized immunotherapies.

Numerous novel antibiotics with high structural variety and origin have been elucidated by Jung's group. The biosynthetic intermediates of ribosomally synthesized and post-translationally modified peptides of several lantibiotics have been analyzed and the corresponding enzymes have been characterized. For the first time these findings established the complete sequential steps for the biosynthesis of several lantibiotics in cooperation with microbiologists. The biosynthesis of vancomycin-type and other peptide antibiotics is now a major topic of the research group of Roderich Süßmuth.

Awards 
In 1989, he was awarded the Max-Bergmann Medallion for his scientific work in the field of Lantibiotics, and in 1992 he received the Leonidas Zervas Award of the European Peptide Society for distinguished contributions in the field of peptide chemistry. He received the Akabori Memorial Award 2000 form the Japanese Peptide Society and the ESCS-Award 2003 of the European Society of Combinatorial Sciences.

Scientific Work and Publications (selection) 

Jung is author and co-author of more than 900 scientific publications, which include about 700 original experimental articles and several books.

Books

Publications in Journals
 
 
 
 
 I.Hoerr, R.Obst, H.-G. Rammensee, and G.Jung:In vivo application of RNA leads to the induction of specific cytotoxic T lymphocytes and antibodies. In: Eur.J.Immunol, 30, 2000, S. 1–7.
 
 
 
 
 
 
 
 
 
 J.S. Heitmann et al., A COVID-19 Peptide Vaccine for the Induction of SARS-COV-2 T-Cell Immunity. In: Nature online, 23. November 2021
 A. Thess, I. Hoerr, B.Y. Panah, G. Jung, and R. Dahm: Historic Nucleic Acids Isolated By Friedrich Miescher Contain RNA Besides DNA. In: Biol. Chem. 402, 2021, S. 1179–1185.

References

External links 
 Internet Homepage of Prof. em. Günther Jung at the Universität of Tübingen
 Von Friedrich Miescher zu Curevac. 150 Jahre Erbgutforschung in Tübingen. Von G.Jung und S. Ground
 Kennen Sie Tübingen? Von Miescher zu CureVac. 150 Jahre Chemie der Erbsubstanz. 

Living people
1937 births
20th-century German chemists
University of Tübingen alumni
University of Houston faculty
Academic staff of the University of Tübingen
21st-century German chemists